Balanophora is a genus of parasitic flowering plants in the family Balanophoraceae found in parts of tropical and temperate Asia, including the Eastern Himalayas, Malesia region, Pacific Islands, Madagascar, and tropical Africa. There are about 20 accepted species, including the newly discovered B. coralliformis. Many species emit an odour which possibly attracts pollinators in the same way that pollinators are attracted to Rafflesia.

Balanophora species are used in folk medicine in many Asian cultures.  For example, in Taiwan and China, Balanophora is known as she-gu (stone-fungus) and in Thailand as hoh-ra-tao-su-nak. In both cases, the plant is used to treat a variety of ailments and has various ritual purposes. The tubers of Balanophora are rich in a wax-like substance which is used in Java as a fuel for torches.

Taxonomy
The genus was first described in 1775 by Johann Reinhold Forster and his son Georg Forster in Characteres Generum Plantarum.

Species 
, the following species are accepted at Plants of the World Online:

Balanophora abbreviata Blume
Balanophora aphylla Luu, H.Ð.Trần & H.C.Nguyen
Balanophora coralliformis Barcelona, Tandang & Pelser
Balanophora cucphuongensis Ban
Balanophora dioica R.Br. ex Royle
Balanophora elongata Blume
Balanophora fargesii (Tiegh.) Harms
Balanophora flava (Hook.f.) Lidén
Balanophora fungosa J.R.Forst. & G.Forst. (type species)
Balanophora harlandii Hook.f.
Balanophora involucrata Hook.f. & Thomson
Balanophora japonica Makino
Balanophora latisepala (Tiegh.) Lecomte
Balanophora laxiflora Hemsl.
Balanophora lowii Hook.f.
Balanophora nipponica Makino
Balanophora papuana Schltr.
Balanophora polyandra Griff.
Balanophora reflexa Becc.
Balanophora subcupularis P.C.Tam
Balanophora tobiracola Makino
Balanophora wilderi Setch.
Balanophora yakushimensis Hatus. & Masam.

Ecology
Balanophora yuwanensis, "often considered the same species as B. yakushimensis", is thought to provide the endangered dark-furred Amami rabbit (Pentalagus furnessi) of the Ryukyu Archipelago with vegetative tissues as a reward for seed dispersal.  Previously, it had been a mystery how seeds of B. yuwanensis were dispersed.

References 

 
Santalales genera